Evan van Moerkerke (born August 16, 1993) is a Canadian competitive swimmer. van Moerkerke won a silver at the 2015 Pan American Games in the 4 x 100 m freestyle relay.

In 2016, he was named to Canada's Olympic team for the 2016 Summer Olympics.

He is in his fourth year studying agricultural science at the University of Guelph. He comes from a family farm in Tillsonburg, Ontario

References

External links
 
 
 
 
 
 

1993 births
Living people
Swimmers from London, Ontario
Canadian male freestyle swimmers
Pan American Games silver medalists for Canada
Olympic swimmers of Canada
Swimmers at the 2016 Summer Olympics
Pan American Games medalists in swimming
Swimmers at the 2015 Pan American Games
Medalists at the 2015 Pan American Games